"Blue River" is a 1965 song by Elvis Presley. He released it on a single in December 1965 or January 1966.

Writing and recording 
The song was written by Paul Evans and Fred Tobias.

Presley recorded it on May 27, 1963 at RCA's Studio B in Nashville, Tennessee.

Track listings 
7-inch single (RCA 47–8740, 1965 or January 1966)
 "Tell Me Why"
 "Blue River"

7-inch single (1965)
 "Blue River"
 "Do Not Disturb"

7-inch single (1965)
 "Blue River" (2:10)
 "You'll Be Gone" (2:20)

7-inch EP (RCA Victor 86.508 M, France, 1966)
 "Blue River"
 "Memphis Tennessee"
 "Puppet on a String"
 "Tell Me Why"

Charts

References

External links 
 Elvis Presley – Blue River / Do Not Disturb (7-inch single) at Discogs
 Elvis Presley - Tell Me Why / Blue River (7-inch single) at Discogs
 Elvis Presley - Blue River / Do Not Disturb (7-inch single) at Discogs
 Elvis Presley With The Jordanaires - Blue River / You'll Be Gone (7-inch single) at Discogs
 Elvis Presley, The Jordanaires - Blue River ... Memphis Tennessee / Puppet on a String / Tell Me Why (7-inch EP, France) at Discogs

1965 songs
1965 singles
Elvis Presley songs
RCA Records singles
Songs written by Paul Evans (musician)
Songs written by Fred Tobias